Enikku Vishakkunnu is a 1983 Indian Malayalam film, directed by P. Bhaskaran and produced by Jaya Vijaya, Thomas Keeppuram and M. A. John. The film stars Nedumudi Venu, Ambika, Achankunju and Kottayam Valsalan in the lead roles. The film has musical score by Jaya Vijaya.

Cast
 
Nedumudi Venu as Chacko 
Ambika as Shantha 
Achankunju as Mathai
Kottayam Valsalan as Rajappan
Kaviyoor Ponnamma as Chinnamma
Sukumari as Naaniparuthi
N. S. Ittan as Pakkaran
Mavelikkara Ramachandran
Beena Bhaskaran as Marykutty
Sreemandiram Rajalakhmi

Soundtrack
The music was composed by Jaya Vijaya and the lyrics were written by P. Bhaskaran.

References

External links
 

1983 films
1980s Malayalam-language films
Films directed by P. Bhaskaran
Films scored by Jaya Vijaya